John Anderson White (28 April 1937 – 21 July 1964) was a Scottish international football midfielder and sometime inside right who played a significant role for Tottenham Hotspur (Spurs) during their Double winning season in 1960–61. He had two brothers, Eddie and Tom, who were also professional footballers. White was killed by a lightning strike at the age of 27.

Playing career

Alloa Athletic
White first played at senior level for Alloa Athletic under the management of Jasper 'Jerry' Kerr. He debuted in the 1956/57 season. Kerr paired White in an effective inside forward combination with Dennis Gillespie. In the 68 league appearances White made for The Wasps, he scored 26 goals.

The John White Lounge is still a feature at the Clackmannanshire club's ground.

Falkirk
White was bought by Falkirk in August 1958 for £3,300 (£ today). Alex Parker and Eddie O'Hara had been jointly sold to Everton the June before giving Falkirk a cash injection of £18,000. Among others at Falkirk, White played alongside Doug Moran. In White's 30 Falkirk league appearances he scored 11 goals. His stay there was relatively short, moving to England early in his second season.

White made his Scotland debut when he was at Falkirk. He scored in the first minute of his international debut, a 3–2 win against West Germany on 6 May 1959 at Hampden Park. He gained four full caps when at Falkirk playing in the first and last of those four games alongside Dave Mackay. The fourth game was against a Northern Ireland team in Belfast featuring Danny Blanchflower on 3 October 1959. White scored his second international goal in a 4–0 win for the Scots.

Tottenham Hotspur
White's frail appearance had been the cause of considerable concern amongst scouts, resulting in a number of English First Division clubs choosing not to risk his signing. However, following positive reviews from Mackay and Blanchflower, Bill Nicholson signed White for Tottenham Hotspur in the same October as White's international goal against Northern Ireland. Nicholson had also sought reference from the Army and been advised White was a celebrated cross-country runner. White cost £22,000 (£ today).

At Spurs, White initially occupied the inside-left position, having been bought by Nicholson to replace Dave Dunmore, but his talent flourished as an inside right as a replacement to Tommy Harmer. He scored on his debut in October 1959, in a 2–1 defeat to Sheffield Wednesday at Hillsborough. White's worth to the team could be calculated in terms of goals scored (between 1959 and the conclusion of the Double winning season (a season in which he was ever-present) he contributed 18 goals) but his success mainly lay in a combination of skills: his passing, his ball control which helped sustain the attacking momentum but so too his runs to find space off the ball, arriving unexpectedly in the opposition's penalty area which resulted in the White Hart Lane faithful giving him the nickname "The Ghost".

Spurs lost against Benfica in the 1961–62 European Cup semi-final, however in the following season White was part of the successful campaign that saw Tottenham become the first English winners of a European trophy when they won the 1963 European Cup Winners' Cup Final. They beat Atlético Madrid 5–1 in Rotterdam with White scoring Spurs' second. They had beaten White's Scottish former opponents, Rangers, home and away in the first round.

Cliff Jones, his Tottenham teammate, said of him: "He was a great talent. People ask me what he was like. I say that he was like Glenn Hoddle. But he was different to Glenn in some ways. Glenn was someone who you had to bring into a game, whereas John White would bring himself into a game. If you're not in possession, get in position, that was John White. He was always available if you needed to pass to someone".

Death and testimonial
White was killed by a lightning strike at the age of 27 while sheltering under a tree during a thunderstorm at Crews Hill golf course, Enfield on 21 July 1964. He left a 22-year-old widow, Sandra, daughter of Spurs' assistant manager Harry Evans, whom he married in 1961, and two children.

White's testimonial was staged later in the year he died, on 10 November 1964, at White Hart Lane, when a Tottenham XI faced a Scotland XI. White's younger brother Tom, played for Tottenham in this match, scoring the first goal of the game from a pass from Jimmy Greaves. White's portrait has been erected in the entrance to the Scottish Football Hall of Fame.

His son Rob has no memory of his father, as he was only six months old when he died, and his older sister Mandy was only two at the time. White also had a son, Stephen, from his first marriage to Helen McLean; however, he and his first wife separated within weeks of their marriage and he never saw his first-born son, who did not discover the identity of his real father until he was a teenager.

Career statistics

International appearances

International goals
Scores and results list Scotland's goal tally first.

References

External links
The Ghost at mehstg.com
the Spurs 1960–61 squad at spursodyssey.com
The life of Mr Tottenham Hotspur (minor mention) at BBC

1937 births
1964 deaths
Alloa Athletic F.C. players
Association football inside forwards
Deaths from lightning strikes
Falkirk F.C. players
Sportspeople from Musselburgh
Scotland international footballers
Scottish Football Hall of Fame inductees
Scottish Football League players
Scottish Football League representative players
Scottish footballers
Scotland under-23 international footballers
English Football League players
English Football League representative players
Tottenham Hotspur F.C. players
FA Cup Final players
Footballers from East Lothian